Hans Heintze (4 February 1911 – 5 March 2003) was a German Kantor and organist.

Life 
In 1929, he began studying classical philology at the University of Leipzig. Later he moved to study church music at the University of Music and Theatre Leipzig, which he completed with Günther Ramin (organ) and Carl Adolf Martienssen (piano). Fritz Reuter was also one of his teachers in Leipzig.

In 1930, he became the permanent assistant to  Ramin. After first positions as cantor and organist in Bad Oldesloe (1932-1934) and as cathedral cantor at the Sophienkirche in Dresden (1934-1939), Heintze succeeded Günther Ramin in 1940 as organist of the Thomaskirche in Leipzig. There, he worked, with interruptions, until 1948. During his war service in the Wehrmacht and Soviet captivity, Heintze was assisted by Eberhard Bonitz (1941), Eduard Büchsel (1941/42), Beate Schmidt (1942/43), Günter Metz (1942, 1943/44), Christian Göttsching (1944), Christa Wildeis (1944-1949) and Ekkehard Tietze (1948/49). Außerdem leitete er den Lehrergesangsverein in Leipzig.

From 1949, he was first church musician at St. John's Church, Lüneburg and in 1955 professor at the Hochschule für Musik "Hanns Eisler" in Berlin. Heintze succeeded  as senior church musician and cathedral cantor at the Bremen St. Petri Dom and director of the Bremer Domchor. He worked together with the organist Wilhelm Evers. Heintze worked at Bremen's St. Peter's Cathedral until 1975, when he retired for reasons of age and his post was taken over by Wolfgang Helbich.

Heintze died in Bremen at the age of 92.

Recordings 
 Johann Sebastian Bach: Matthäuspassion. Calig-Verlag, Munich 1987
 Chormusik zur Weihnacht. Dabringhaus + Grimm, Detmold; EMI-Electrola ASD, Cologne 1984
 Vom ewigen Zauber barocker Orgeln. Deutsche Grammophon, Hamburg 1981
 Johann Sebastian Bach: Orgelwerke. Johannes Stauda, Kassel 1980/1981
 Festliche Musik zur Weihnachtszeit. Deutsche Schallplatten, Berlin 1978
 Wolfgang Amadeus Mozart: Requiem in d-moll KV 626. Sound-Star-Tonproduction, Steyerberg 1976
 Antonín Dvořák: Stabat mater, B 71. Sound-Star-Tonproduction, Steyerberg 1975
 Johann Pachelbel: Orgelwerke. Deutsche Grammophon, Hamburg 1967/1982

Further reading 
 Klaus Blum: Musikfreunde und Musici – Musikleben in Bremen seit der Aufklärung. Hans Schneider Verlag, Tutzing 1975, .

References

External links 
 
 
 Musik am Bremer Dom – Geschichte des Bremer Domchores

German classical organists
Academic staff of the Hochschule für Musik Hanns Eisler Berlin
1911 births
2003 deaths
Musicians from Lower Saxony